Rhythm & Romance is the fifteenth studio album (and 1st album under Concord Records) by Kenny G. The first of two bossa nova albums by the artist, the album peaked at number 15 on the R&B/Hip-Hop Albums chart, and number 14 on the Billboard 200. There was a tour supporting the album, called An Evening of Rhythm & Romance.

Track listing

"Sax-O-Loco" - 5:13 (Walter Afanasieff, Kenny G)
"Ritmo Y Romance (Rhythm & Romance)" - 7:11 (Walter Afanasieff, Kenny G)
"Sabor A Mí" - 4:22 (Álvaro Carrillo)
"Tango" - 5:27 (Walter Afanasieff, Kenny G)
"Mirame Bailar" (featuring: Barbara Muñoz) - 3:51 (Walter Afanasieff, Claudia Brant)
"Peruvian Nights" - 6:16 (Walter Afanasieff, Kenny G)
"Brasilia" - 6:42 (Walter Afanasieff, Kenny G)
"Besame Mucho" - 7:11 (Consuelo Velázquez)
"Fiesta Loca" - 4:10 (Walter Afanasieff, Kenny G)
"Es Hora De Decir" (featuring: Camila) - 5:18 (Walter Afanasieff, Claudia Brant)
"Copa De Amor" - 6:00 (Walter Afanasieff, Kenny G)
"Salsa Kenny" - 5:17 (Walter Afanasieff, Kenny G)

Personnel 
 Kenny G – soprano saxophone (1-8, 10, 11, 12), tenor saxophone (9)
 Walter Afanasieff – acoustic piano (1-9, 11, 12), keyboard programming (10), rhythm programming (10)
 Enrique Martinez – accordion (2, 4, 8)
 Tyler Gordon – programming (10)
 Emanuel Kiriakou – programming (10)
 Ramon Stagnero – guitars (1-9, 11, 12)
 Pablo Hurtado – guitars (10)
 John Pena – bass (1, 2, 4, 5, 8, 9, 12)
 Nathan East – bass (3, 6, 7, 11)
 Alex Acuña – drums (1-9, 11, 12)
 Michito Sanchez – percussion (1, 2, 4, 5, 8, 9, 12)
 Ron Powell – percussion (1, 2, 7, 9, 11)
 Rafael Padilla – percussion (2, 3, 8)
 Paulinho da Costa – percussion (3, 6, 7, 11)
 Dan Higgins – saxophones (5)
 Andy Martin – trombone (5)
 Bill Reichenbach Jr. – trombone (5)
 Daniel Fornero – trumpet (5)
 Gary Grant – trumpet (5)
 Jerry Hey – horn arrangements (5)
 Jorge Calandrelli – orchestra arrangements and conductor (2, 3, 4, 6, 7, 8, 11)
 Gina Zimmitti – orchestra contractor (2, 3, 4, 6, 7, 8, 11)
 Barbara Muñoz – vocals (5)
 Mario Domm – vocals (10)
 Samo – vocals (10)

Production 
 Kenny G – producer, arrangements 
 Walter Afanasieff – producer, arrangements 
 Chris Brooke – recording (1-4, 6, 7, 8, 11, 12)
 Steve Churchyard – recording (1-4, 6, 7, 8, 11, 12), orchestra recording (2, 3, 4, 6, 7, 8, 11)
 Humberto Gatica – recording (5, 9, 10), mixing 
 Valente Torrez – assistant engineer (5, 9)
 Rodolfo Vasquez – vocal recording (5)
 Gabriel Castañón – assistant vocal engineer (5), assistant engineer (10)
 Tyler Gordon – Pro Tools engineer (10)
 Emanuel Kiriakou – Pro Tools engineer (10)
 Alex Rodriguez – mix assistant 
 Stephen Marcussen – mastering 
 Rich Davis – production coordinator 
 Charlie G – A&R for Barbara Muñoz
 Matt Taylor – art direction, design 
 Michael Muller – photography 
 Danielle Decker – grooming 
 Emma Trask – stylist 
 Karishma Ahluwalia – model 
 Jim Morey – management 

Studios
 Recorded at Westlake Studios, The Village Recorder and Chalice Recording Studios (Los Angeles, California); Conway Studios (Hollywood, California); Mamita Estudios (Mexico City, Mexico).
 Orchestra recorded at Capitol Studios (Hollywood, California).
 Vocal recording on Track 5 recorded at Sony BMG Studios (Mexico).
 Mixed at The G House (Malibu, California).
 Mastered at Marcussen Mastering (Hollywood, California).

References

2008 albums
Kenny G albums
Concord Records albums
Albums produced by Walter Afanasieff